Thomas Barnardiston may refer to:

Sir Thomas Barnardiston (puritan) (1541-1619), 
Sir Thomas Barnardiston, 1st Baronet (died 1669), English politician
Sir Thomas Barnardiston, 2nd Baronet (died 1698), English nobleman and politician
Thomas Barnardiston (legal writer) (died 1752), English barrister and legal reporter